Gorkhaland Territorial Administration election will be held on 26 June 2022 to elect all 45 members of Gorkhaland Territorial Administration, in West Bengal state, India.

Background 
The previous election took place in 2012 which was won by GJM. In 2017, all GJM councillors resigned from their posts stating that GTA failed to fulfill their expectations and aspirations of the people. Sooner Binay Tamang was appointed by the Government of West Bengal as acting chairman of the body. Later Anit Thapa was appointed as its acting chairman.

Following the municipal election all over the state, West Bengal State Election Commission announced the date of poll on 27 May 2022. GJM leader and previous chairman of GTA, Bimal Gurung started a hunger strike in demand for the postponement of the election, just after the poll date was announced. BJP also supported Gurung and stated that GTA is not a permanent solution of the Gorkha issues.

Schedule 
The election schedule was declared by West Bengal State Election Commission on 27 May 2022.

Parties and alliances 
The party which won the last election, Gorkha Janmukti Morcha officially didn't fielded any candidates, however its members contested from all 45 seats as independent candidates. On the other hand, Trinamool Congress, the ruling party in the state confirmed that they will contest from only 10 seats. BGPM broke its alliance with TMC and decided to contest from 36 seats on their own. Newly formed Hamro Party also fielded candidates in all seats. 

CPI(M)  fielded 12 candidates and Congress  fielded 5 candidates in the polls. A total of 277 candidates, including 169 independents, are contesting the GTA election. BJP and its allies -  Gorkha National Liberation Front, Communist Party of Revolutionary Marxists and All India Gorkha League decided not to contest the GTA election.

Winning candidates

Bharatiya Gorkha Prajatantrik Morcha
1. Norden Sherpa (Rimbick-Lodhoma constituency)

2. Anos Thapa (Sonada-Pacheng constituency)

3. Yogendra Pradhan (Lebong-Badamtam constituency)

4. Arun Singchi (Soureni-Mirik constituency)

5. Mani Kumar Rai (Takling-Peshok constituency)

6. Satish Pokhrel (Relling Kaijalia constituency)

7. Dhandup Pakhrin (Takhdah-Teesta Valley constituency)

8. Dawa Tenji (Algarah constituency)

9. Senora Namchu (Chibo constituency)

10. Ratan Thapa (Mangpoo constituency)

11. Anit Thapa (Kurseong constituency)

13. Hemant Rai (Relli-Samthar constituency)

14. Kamal Subba (Pedong constituency)

15. Amar Chettri (Kumai-Samsing Tea Garden constituency)

16. Sanchabir Subbha (Nimbong-Gitdabling constituency)

17. Uday Dewan (Sukhia-Mane Bhanjang constituency)

18. Anju Chauhan (Nagari-Dhajea constituency)

19. Sandeep Chettri (Chungtong- Marybong constituency)

20. Harka Man Chettri (Ward No.44)

21. Sanchabir Subba (Ward No.41)

22. Lakpa Namgyal Bhutia (Ward No. 45)

23. Parthi Nobel Bomzon (Pokhreabong-Chamong constituency)

24. Ratan Thapa Bhutia, Kalimpong Ward No. 43

25. Nuri Sherpa (Tung Saint Maries constituency)

26. Rajesh Chauhan (Rangbull constituency)

27. Shyam Sherpa (Kurseong-Deorali constituency)

Hamro Party
1. Ajoy Edward (Darjeeling Sadar 3 constituency)

2. Robert Chettri (Darjeeling Sadar 2 constituency)

3. Pratim Subbha (Darjeeling Sadar 1 constituency)

4. Bhupendra Chettri (Goke Bijanbari constituency)

5. Jiten Rai (Pandam - Phu Tshering constituency)

6. Sunny Tamang (Takdah-glenburn constituency)

7. Ruben Das Pradhan (Darjeeling Sadar 4 constituency) 

8. Prabhaskar Blon (Ghoom-Jorebungalow constituency)

All India Trinamool Congress
1. Binay Tamang (Dali-Bloomfield constituency)

2. Suman Gurung (Bong-Durpin constituency)

3. Dhruva Bomzon (Seyok- Okaity constituency)

4. Milesh Rai (Mirik-Thurbo constituency)

5. Pranesh Tirkey (Sukuna-Panighatta constituency)

Independent
1. Palden Tamang (Pudung Khasmahal Sindebong constituency)

2. Bikash Rai (Bhalukhop-Kalimpong constituency)

3. Suraj Rai (Singamari-Tukvar constituency)

4. Kumar Sharma (Lava-Lingsey constituency)

5. Bhire Rai (Mansong-Ramphu constituency)

Results 

" * " denotes parties that are contesting the election as independent candidates (not with any party symbols)

Aftermath
After the election result was out, West Bengal chief minister Mamata Banerjee said that Trinamool Congress had alliance with BGPM. BGPM president Anit Thapa went to meet Mamata Banerjee in Kolkata after a few days.

All 45 elected member took oath on 13 July. BGPM had the majority on their own as they had won 27 seats. BGPM along with its ally TMC, and other three independent members, formed the board. Anit Thapa became the chief executive of GTA while Rajesh Chauhan became its chairman. Their oath taking ceremony took place on 14 July in the presence of Governor Jagdeep Dhankhar.

References 

Politics of Gorkhaland
2022 elections in India
Elections in West Bengal